Gurmesh Singh is an Australian politician of Sikh Punjabi descent. He has been a member of the New South Wales Legislative Assembly since 2019, representing Coffs Harbour for the Nationals.

Singh was a blueberry and macadamia farmer before his election to parliament.

References

 

National Party of Australia members of the Parliament of New South Wales
Living people
Year of birth missing (living people)
Members of the New South Wales Legislative Assembly
Australian people of Indian descent
Coffs Harbour
21st-century Australian politicians